The Church of Santa Catalina (Spanish: Iglesia de Santa Catalina) is a church located in Caudete, Spain. It was declared Bien de Interés Cultural in 1992.

References 

Roman Catholic churches in Castilla–La Mancha
Bien de Interés Cultural landmarks in the Province of Albacete